The 64th Nations Cup was the 2011 edition of the Nations Cup. 
The competition was hosted as normal in Montreux from April 20 to 24, 2011.

Group stage

Group A

Group B

Semifinals

Final

Final ranking

External links
 Official website

References

Nations Cup (roller hockey)
Sport in Montreux
2011 in roller hockey
2011 in Swiss sport
S